Elk River is an unincorporated community in Humboldt County, California. All the residents of this neighborhood have Eureka, California addresses.

There are two wooden covered bridges in the Elk River area. The community is named for the river draining the portion of Humboldt Bay watershed between Salmon Creek to the south and Freshwater Creek to the north.

References

Unincorporated communities in Humboldt County, California
Unincorporated communities in California